Scalideutis escharia is a moth in the family Cosmopterigidae. It was described by Edward Meyrick in 1906. It is found in Sri Lanka.

References

Scaeosophinae
Moths described in 1906